Judge Webb may refer to:

Edwin Y. Webb (1872–1955), judge of the United States District Court for the Western District of North Carolina
George Webb (judge) (1828–1891), judge of the Supreme Court of Victoria
John Richmond Webb (judge) (1721–1766), Welsh judge
Nathan Webb (judge) (1825–1902), judge of the United States District Court for the District of Maine
Rodney Scott Webb (1935–2009), judge of the United States District Court for the District of North Dakota
Thomas Webb (judge) (1845–1916), Australian judge of the equity side of the Supreme Court of Victoria

See also
Justice Webb (disambiguation)